Konstantinos Konstantopoulos (1832, Tripoli, Greece – 11 November 1910, Athens) was a conservative Greek politician and briefly Prime Minister of Greece.

Early political career
During the reign of King Otto, Konstantopoulos was a Mayor of Patras and later leader of the Prefectures of Achaia and Elis.  He was successful in averting bloodshed in a feud in that area.

Parliament and Prime Minister
Konstantopoulos was eventually elected as a member of the Nationalist Party to the parliament representing Mantineia, a town in northern Arcadia and by 1890 he was elected President of the Parliament.  In 1892, the Prime Minister, Theodoros Deligiannis was asked to resign by the king over continuing disagreements between the Prime Minister and Crown over economic policy, despite the fact that the Prime Minister maintained the confidence of the Parliament.  The king, in dismissing the Prime Minister called for new elections and asked Konstantopoulos, a fellow member of Deligiannis' Nationalist Party, to form a government on February 18, 1892.  Konstantopoulos led his party in the May 3 election, but Charilaos Trikoupis' New Party won the election and on June 10, 1892, Konstantopoulos was replaced by Trikoupis.

He remained active in politics and a member of parliament until 1904.  Konstantopoulos died in Athens in November 1910.

Sources
 Historical Information (in Greek)

See also
History of Modern Greece

1832 births
1910 deaths
19th-century prime ministers of Greece
People from Tripoli, Greece
Prime Ministers of Greece
Speakers of the Hellenic Parliament